Dysgenics (also known as cacogenics) is the decrease in prevalence of traits deemed to be either socially desirable or well adapted to their environment due to selective pressure disfavoring the reproduction of those traits.

The adjective "dysgenic" is the antonym of "eugenic". In 1915 the term was used by David Starr Jordan to describe the supposed deleterious effects of modern warfare on group-level genetic fitness because of its tendency to kill physically healthy men while preserving the disabled at home. Similar concerns had been raised by early eugenicists and social Darwinists during the 19th century, and continued to play a role in scientific and public policy debates throughout the 20th century. More recent concerns about supposed dysgenic effects in human populations have been advanced by the controversial psychologist Richard Lynn, notably in his 1996 book Dysgenics: Genetic Deterioration in Modern Populations, which argued that a reduction in selection pressures and decreased infant mortality since the Industrial Revolution have resulted in an increased propagation of deleterious traits and genetic disorders. In popular culture, concerns about dysgenics have also formed the basis for speculative fiction, notably the 2006 film Idiocracy.

Despite these concerns, genetic studies have shown no evidence for dysgenic effects in human populations.

In fiction 
Cyril M. Kornbluth's 1951 short story "The Marching Morons" is an example of dysgenic fiction, describing a man who accidentally ends up in the distant future and discovers that dysgenics has resulted in mass stupidity. Mike Judge's 2006 film Idiocracy has the same premise, with the main character the subject of a military hibernation experiment that goes awry, taking him 500 years into the future. While in "The Marching Morons", civilization is kept afloat by a small group of dedicated geniuses, in Idiocracy, voluntary childlessness among high-IQ couples leaves only automated systems to fill that role.

See also 
Devolution (biology)
Flynn effect
Heritability of IQ
List of congenital disorders
List of biological development disorders

Notes

Further reading 
 
 
 
 Barban et al. 2016, "Genome-wide analysis identifies 12 loci influencing human reproductive behavior"

Eugenics
Evolutionary biology
Futures studies